Gods and Generals is the soundtrack album to the 2003 film of the same title. The album features the film's original score composed by John Frizzell and Randy Edelman, as well as two songs by Mary Fahl and Bob Dylan.

Track listing
 Going Home (3:56) – performed by Mary Fahl
 Gods and Generals (3:42)
 You Must Not Worry for Us (2:09)
 Loved I Not Honor More (3:13)
 Lexington is My Home (1:23)
 The School of the Soldier (3:58)
 Go to their Graves Like Beds (2:24)
 My Heart Shall Not Fear (1:46)
 These Brave Irishmen (2:51)
 To the Stone Wall (3:41)
 You'll Thank Me in the Morning (3:20)
 The First Crop of Corn (3:26)
 My Home is Virginia (4:24)
 No Photographs (2:53)
 VMI Will Be Heard from Today (2:42)
 Too Much Sugar (1:56)
 Let Us Cross the River (2:48)
 The Soldier's Return (2:02)
 Cross the Green Mountain (8:14) – performed by Bob Dylan

Credits
 All score by John Frizzell, except M7, M8 and M13 composed by Randy Edelman, and M14 composed by John Frizzell and Randy Edelman.
 Score Conducted by: Nick Ingman and Randy Edelman. 
 Orchestrations by: Andrew Kinney, Jeff Atmajian, Frank Bennett, Bruce Babcock, Stuart Balcom, Robert Elhai, Don Nemitz, Lolita Ritmanis and Carl Rydlund.
 Featured musical soloists: Mark O'Connor (violin) and Paddy Moloney (tin whistle and uilleann pipes)
 Recorded and mixed by: Rick Winquest and Elton Ahi
 Edited by: Lisa Jaime
 Composer assistant & additional engineering: Tom Trafalski
 Mastered by: Pat Sullivan
 Album produced by: John Frizzell and Randy Edelman.

Footnotes

2003 soundtrack albums
Sony Classical Records soundtracks
Drama film soundtracks
War film soundtracks